Thomas Edison Preparatory School is a public school located in midtown Tulsa, Oklahoma serving students from the 6th grade to the 12th grade.

Overview
The school was recently ranked by Newsweek as the #467 best high school in the nation. This ranking puts them #2 in Tulsa  and #3 in Oklahoma. In 2005, 92 percent of Edison seniors graduated. Edison has more than 30 clubs and organizations for the estimated 2,220 students enrolled. The school recently became a "Program of Choice" (replacing the former program called Magnet Schools). The school offers a wide variety of classes including three foreign languages (French, Spanish, Chinese). They also offer classes that range from Music, Leadership, and Drama.

The school opened in 1956 on a  lot on 41st street between Harvard and Lewis.

Extracurricular Activity
Edison Preparatory has Extracurricular classes, like their Marching Band and their Choir, which semi consistently gets finals at contests such as Oologah and Bixby

Notable alumni
Tom Adelson - State Senator 
Daniel Borochoff - Founder of CharityWatch
Cindy Chupack - Screenwriter and film director, winner of three Golden Globes and two Emmys
Larry Drake - Actor, multiple Emmy winner
Mike Fanning - NFL Defensive Lineman, 10 Years Los Angeles Rams, Notre Dame '73 NCAA Football National Champions
Bill Goldberg (born 1966), professional NFL football player, undefeated wrestler, and actor
Jason Graae - American musical-theater actor
Bill Hader - Actor/comedian
William F. Martin - United States Deputy Secretary of Energy
Kevin Pritchard - Basketball player, NBA general manager (Portland Trail Blazers)
Carl Radle - bass guitarist for Derek and the Dominos
Bill Raffensperger - Tulsa Sound musician, bassist for J. J. Cale
Nancy Riley - State Senator
Susan Savage - Former mayor of Tulsa
Phil Seymour - musician
Ted Shackelford - Actor
Spencer Tillman - All-American Running Back (Oklahoma), TV Sports Analyst
Jeanne Tripplehorn - Actress
Dwight Twilley - musician
Marcia Mitchell - Co-Founder and first Executive Director for 40 years of The Little Lighthouse https://www.littlelighthouse.org/ and Author of Milestones & Miracles

References

External links 
Edison Preparatory School Homepage
Tulsa Public Schools Homepage
Tulsa's Edison Foundation Homepage
Edison Eagles Alumni Site
Edison Eagles Class of 1981 Alumni Site

Public high schools in Oklahoma
Educational institutions established in 1954
Public middle schools in Oklahoma
1954 establishments in Oklahoma
Tulsa Public Schools schools